The Bloch MB.160 was a fourteen-seat French airliner intended for use in the French African colonies. Three were built and two entered service with Régie Air-Afrique at the start of World War II. Developments included the Bloch MB.162 bomber which was too late for service and the Sud-Est SE.161 Languedoc, one hundred of which were built post-war.

Development

The first flight of the Bloch MB.160 was on 18 June 1937, piloted by André Curvale at Villacoublay, Marcel Bloch's base.

On 20 August, now named the Lieutenant-Génin, it was one of thirteen aircraft from three countries (France, Italy and the UK) to take part in a  race from France to Syria and back, flying from Istres to Damascus and returning to Paris.

By March 1938 it had completed testing at Marignane and had returned to Villacoublay for minor aileron alterations and for some internal revision. By this time a second example was under way. As late as November 1938 one Bloch MB.160 was back for further modifications to the wing. In July 1939 the first of two delivered to Air-Afrique (only the second and third Bloch 160s appeared on the French civil register) had completed its exploration flights, with passengers, in Algeria.

Though only three MB.160s were built a development of it, the MB.161, was the pre-war prototype of the Sud-Est SE.161 Languedoc. Its first flight was in September 1939; one hundred of them were built post-war. The Languedoc had a 7% greater span, twin end plate fins and a slightly shorter fuselage.   Gnome-Rhône 14N44/45 radial engines replaced the Hispano-Suizas in the prototype but production aircraft had   Pratt & Whitney R-1830-92 Twin Wasp radials.

The MB.162 was the final MB.160 variant, initially developed for long range flights but flown as a bomber. Like the MB.161, it had twin fins and Gnome-Rhône 14N engines. Only one was built, making its first flight on 1 June 1940.

Design

The all-metal Bloch MB.160 was designed to meet the needs of Régie Air-Afrique on its routes between French colonies in Africa.

It was a four engine, cantilever low wing monoplane.  In plan the wing was triangular apart from elliptical tips, with sweep only on the leading edge.  It had three parts, a centre section that extended just past the outer engines and carried split flaps which continued under the fuselage, and two outer sections with trailing edges largely occupied by balanced ailerons. The wing had two longerons on each side, the forward ones parallel to the leading edge and the rear at right angles to the fuselage.  These were bound together in the centre section by a trellis of box-girders. The wing skin was stressed  Vedal sheet, flush riveted together.

The Bloch MB.160 was powered by four  Hispano-Suiza 12Xirs.1 V-12 engines. They were water-cooled with oval radiators immediately behind the propeller disc and were mounted well ahead of the leading edge, enclosed in cowlings which extended a little way aft of the leading edge.  Their fuel was in centre section tanks.

It had an oval section fuselage formed by a series of frames and bulkheads, joined by longerons and covered in stressed Vedal.  The four crew, two pilots, a flight engineer and a radio operator, worked together in a well-glazed cockpit linked by a corridor to the passengers' cabin. Their accommodation was configurable but the Air-Afrique layout provided chaise-longues/couchettes for ten and armchairs for four. With a pair of armchairs in the place of each chaise-longue, twenty-four passenger might have been carried. At the rear of the cabin there was a bar, toilets and, behind them, a baggage compartment.

The MB.160 had conventional empennage, with the tailplane and elevators mounted near the top of the fuselage.  Together, they were tapered and round tipped; the elevators, like the rudder, had trim tabs. The latter was straight-edged and balanced. Though it extended to the keel, it was hinged non-vertically so was far enough back to clear the elevators.  The fin was  essentially triangular. All the rear surfaces had steel internal structures rather like those of the wing.

It had retractable conventional landing gear mounted just behind the leading edge of the wing under the inner engines and hydraulically retracting into their nacelles between the engine and the forward wing spar. Each undercarriage unit carried a single low pressure wheel, equipped with a brake, between two oleo-pneumatic legs. There was a fork-mounted tailwheel.

Variants
MB.160
3 built.
MB.161
Prototype of the SE.161 Languedoc. Similar to MB.160 but with twin fins, Gnome-Rhône 14N44/45 radial engines and revised dimensions.  33 passengers, 100 built postwar with Pratt & Whitney R-1830 Twin Wasps.
MB.162
Designed as long range variant of MB.160, with twin fins, shorter fuselage and Gnome-Rhône 14N. Built as a heavy bomber but only 1 completed.

Operators
Régie Air-Afrique

Specifications (MB.160)

References

Bloch aircraft
1930s French airliners
Low-wing aircraft
Four-engined tractor aircraft
Aircraft first flown in 1937
Four-engined piston aircraft